George H. Flamank (1904 – January 29, 1987) was an American football and basketball player and coach. He served as the head football coach (1930–1931) and head men's basketball coach (1930–1932) at Southeast Missouri State University. Flamank was a standout athlete at the University of Missouri.

Flamank was born in Chicago and raised in St. Joseph, Missouri, where graduated from Benton High School in 1924. He later coached football and basketball at Stanberry High School in Stanberry, Missouri, leading his football team to a undefeated season in 1951. Flamank was also the mayor of Albany, Missouri. He died on January 29, 1987, at hospital in Columbia, Missouri.

Head coaching record

College football

References

External links
 

1904 births
1987 deaths
American football quarterbacks
Missouri Tigers football players
Missouri Tigers men's basketball players
Southeast Missouri State Redhawks football coaches
Southeast Missouri State Redhawks men's basketball coaches
High school basketball coaches in Missouri
High school football coaches in Missouri
Mayors of places in Missouri
People from Albany, Missouri
Sportspeople from Chicago
Sportspeople from St. Joseph, Missouri
Coaches of American football from Missouri
Players of American football from Missouri
Players of American football from Chicago